Mihai Botez may refer to:

 Mihai Botez (gymnast), Romanian gymnast who competed in the 1952 Summer Olympics
 Mihai Botez (mathematician), Romanian mathematician and political dissident 
 Mihai Ioan Botez (1927–1998), Romanian neurologist